Palestinian Brazilians are Brazilian people with Palestinian ancestry, or Palestinian-born immigrants in Brazil.

Palestinian refugees in Brazil

The first party of 35 Palestinian refugees arrived on 21 September 2007 in Brazil to initiate the first phase of the resettlement operation. In October, two other parties were expected to arrive in Brazil, making 117 persons in total.

Some settled in the state of São Paulo, the most populous and wealthiest in the nation.

See also
 Immigration to Brazil
 Arab Brazilians
 Comitê Brasileiro de Interesse Nacional Palestino

References

Arab Brazilian
Brazil